Visionary is the fourth studio album by Puerto Rican singer Farruko, released on October 23, 2015, through Sony Music Latin. It was produced by Neonazza, Musicólogo & Menes, Andy Clay, Gabriel Rodríguez, Jumbo, Gaby Music, Ladkani, Montana, Franfussion, DJ Luian, Maffio, Sharo Torres, DJ Chino, Frabian Eli, Rvssian and Ez, and features collaborations with Nicky Jam, Messiah and Pitbull, as well as with reggae musicians Shaggy and Ky-Mani Marley.

At the 17th Annual Latin Grammy Awards, the album was nominated for Best Urban Music Album, being Farruko's third nomination in the category.

The album reached the top position on the Top Latin Albums and Latin Rhythm Albums charts, being his second number-one album on both lists. Additionally, it was certified platinum in United States.

Background
The album was released on 2015 following Farruko signing with Sony Music Latin earlier the same year, he had previously worked with several record labels such as Full Records, Siente Music and El Cartel Records, additionally, Sony Music partnered with Carbon Fiber Music, a label founded by Farruko himself. Prior to the release of Visionary, Farruko released a compilation album titled The Ones under Universal Music Group. To promote the album, Farruko embarked on the Visionary World Tour.

Singles
The first single for the album was "Chapi Chapi", a collaboration with Dominican rapper Messiah, released on April 28, 2015. The second single was "Sunset", featuring Jamaican musician Shaggy and American singer Nicky Jam, released on June 8, 2015, the song peaked at number 3 at the Hot Latin Songs chart. Aside from the singles, the songs "Chillax" and "Obsesionado" also charted on the Hot Latin Songs chart, both peaking at number 4, additionally, the former peaked at number 16 at the Bubbling Under Hot 100 chart. "Sunset" as well as "Chillax" and "Obsesionado" were certified platinum in United States.

Track listing

Charts

Certifications

References

2015 albums
Farruko albums